Bugsnax is an adventure video game developed by independent Chicago-based developer Young Horses. In the game, players explore a mysterious island and attempt to find and capture the eponymous half-bug-half-snack creatures. The game was unveiled in June 2020 during Sony's PlayStation 5 live-streamed reveal event. British indie pop band Kero Kero Bonito performed the game's theme song, which was featured in the announcement trailer. The game was released in November 2020 for the PlayStation 4 and PlayStation 5, as well as macOS and Windows via the Epic Games Store. Versions of the game for Steam, Nintendo Switch, Xbox One, and Xbox Series X/S followed in April 2022.

Gameplay
Bugsnax is a first-person adventure game, in which players traverse the mysterious Snaktooth Island to find clues regarding the disappearance of a missing explorer. The core gameplay revolves around finding and capturing different species of Bugsnax, the half-bug-half-snack creatures that inhabit the island. The game launched with 100 Bugsnak species available for capture, each of which can be found in one of eight biomes during different times of day. The player is equipped with a "SnaxScope" that can be used to scan each Bugsnak, which displays its movement patterns, tastes, and clues as to how to capture it. The player can also obtain several tools to assist in capturing the Bugsnax, including a slingshot that can shoot different sauces such as ketchup and chocolate to lure Bugsnax; a tripwire that can be used to stun Bugsnax; and a Strabby, a strawberry-like Bugsnak in a plastic ball that can be guided using a laser pointer. Some Bugsnax require more advanced techniques to capture them, such as using multiple tools in combination or baiting one Bugsnak into attacking another.

The town of Snaxburg acts as the game's central hub from which all other areas can be reached. During the story, the player will encounter several Grumpuses, the residents of Snaxburg who have scattered themselves around the island. The player must convince each of the Grumpuses to return to Snaxburg to advance the story. When a Grumpus has returned to Snaxburg, they will begin asking the player for favors, which take the form of side quests, and reveal more of their personal history and motivations as each one is completed. These side quests typically involve the player capturing specific Bugsnax and feeding them to the Grumpuses, which transforms parts of their bodies based on the properties of whatever Bugsnak they eat. A "Snaktivator" device unlocked during the game allows the player to more heavily customize each Grumpus's appearance, such as selecting specific body parts to transform.

A free update to the game in April 2022 added a new area to explore and 12 additional Bugsnax to collect for a total of 112. The Bugsnax in this area are larger than normal and must be temporarily shrunken using special "Shrink Spice" before they can be captured. The new area is accessed during the main story as part of a larger side quest. The update also added the ability to fast travel between areas, 25 hats that can be collected and placed on Bugsnax the player has captured, and a hut for the player character in Snaxburg, which can be customized with furniture and decorations received from the other Grumpuses. New hut decorations can be obtained by completing missions sent by the Grumpuses to the player's mailbox, such as finding a lost item or feeding a Grumpus a specific combination of Bugsnax; there are over 100 missions that can be completed.

Plot

Setting and characters
Bugsnax takes place in a world populated by furry muppet-like humanoids called Grumpuses. The game is set on Snaktooth Island, a mysterious island inhabited solely by creatures called Bugsnax who are "half bug and half snack." The ruins of an ancient Grumpus civilization can be found around the island, along with their skeletal remains. Upon discovering the existence of Bugsnax, disgraced explorer Elizabert "Lizbert" Megafig leads an expedition team to the island to study them, establishing the makeshift town of Snaxburg as a base of operations, but disappears under mysterious circumstances. As part of the "Isle of Bigsnax" update, the small neighboring island of Broken Tooth becomes accessible later in the game.

The player controls a nameless newspaper journalist who is invited by Lizbert to visit Snaktooth Island over the objections of their supervisor, C. Clumby Clumbernut. Aiding the journalist is Filbo Fiddlepie, the self-appointed Mayor of Snaxburg who was left in charge by Lizbert before she disappeared, despite lacking self-confidence. Over the course of the game, the journalist meets several other Grumpuses who joined Lizbert on her expedition. These include Wambus Troubleham, a stubborn sauce-farmer; Beffica Winklesnoot, a gossip-seeking photographer; Gramble Gigglefunny, a rancher who treats Bugsnax as pets instead of food; Wiggle Wigglebottom, a washed-up musician; Triffany Lottablog, Wambus's estranged archaeologist wife investigating her grandmother's disappearance; Cromdo Face, a greedy entrepreneur and con-man; Snorpington "Snorpy" Fizzlebean, an inventor and conspiracy theorist obsessed with the "Grumpinati"; Chandlo Funkbun, Snorpy's overprotective bodybuilder boyfriend; Floofty Fizzlebean, Snorpy's antisocial scientist sibling; Shellsy "Shelda" Woolbag, an alleged prophet who preaches the evils of Bugsnax; and Eggabell Batternugget, the town doctor and Lizbert's romantic partner who also went missing.

Story
A struggling newspaper journalist receives a film strip in the mail from Lizbert, who encourages the journalist to come to Snaktooth Island and document the Bugsnax living there for the world to see. Intrigued, the journalist takes an airship to the island, only to discover that Lizbert has gone missing and all the other Grumpuses that joined her on her expedition have scattered due to interpersonal conflict. Filbo requests that the journalist help him bring the others back to Snaxburg, as they may have clues regarding Lizbert's disappearance.

The journalist gradually convinces each Grumpus to return to Snaxburg. However, the Grumpuses regularly argue with each other, and each of them suffer from their own personal issues that they believe can be solved by eating Bugsnax. Some of them believe that there is a secret conspiracy behind the island: Snorpy thinks that the "Grumpinati" are controlling the Bugsnax, while Shelda warns of their harmful "toxins". One night, Snaxburg is attacked, and signs appear warning its residents to leave the island. Wiggle claims that the "Queen of Bugsnax" is planning to eat the Grumpuses. In the "Isle of Bigsnax" expansion, the journalist can discover a secret room with audio recordings from researcher Alegander Jamfoot. These recordings reveal that the supposed "Grumpinati" are actually the Snakolytes, a secret order Jamfoot is a member of whose goal is to create a new Bugsnak Queen and gain control of all Bugsnax, and that they were responsible for the disappearance of Triffany's grandmother.

After the journalist brings all residents back to Snaxburg, a volcano erupts, triggering an earthquake that destroys the town. Eggabell arrives and leads the journalist and Filbo to a hidden chamber beneath the island, which is itself revealed to be made of Bugsnax. There, they discover that Lizbert has been mutated into a giant creature made up of various Bugsnax. Lizbert explains that Bugsnax are actually mind-altering parasites that eventually transform anyone who regularly consumes them into more Bugsnax, as they had done to the island's previous inhabitants, and she has been attempting to keep the Bugsnax under control as their queen. With her control waning, Lizbert urges the group to flee the island, and Eggabell becomes part of the "queen" as well to support her efforts. Filbo and the journalist return to Snaxburg, which is now under attack from various Bugsnax. If the player fails to defend the Grumpuses during the sequence, they can die from eating the Bugsnax attacking them, becoming Bugsnax themselves. However, any Grumpus whose side quests have all been completed will fight back against the Bugsnax and automatically survive the encounter. After fending off the Bugsnax, the journalist, Filbo, and any survivors escape on the journalist's airship.

Upon returning to the mainland, Filbo acts as a witness for the journalist's story, passing Bugsnax off as fictional creatures. Clumby is impressed with the story, but fires the journalist anyway. Filbo then decides to run for Mayor of New Grump City, asking for the journalist's help. Saving every Grumpus during the finale unlocks an alternate credits sequence revealing each Grumpus's current whereabouts, including that Filbo has been elected Mayor and Lizbert and Eggabell have been de-transformed, and a post-credits scene. In it, Clumby can be heard talking to Jamfoot, believing that the journalist is hiding the truth and deciding to keep watch on them, revealing herself to be a Snakolyte. Meanwhile, a single Strabby emerges from inside the airship. If the player also listened to all of Jamfoot's audio recordings, an alternate scene plays in which Jamfoot calls Clumby, fearful that the journalist knows all the Snakolytes' secrets, and orders her to find out all she can about the survivors of Snaktooth.

Development
Young Horses took about six years to develop the game in order "not to burn out", as well as "to figure out what the game was." The initial idea was when the company's creative director Kevin Zuhn drew a sketch of a "Wafflepillar"—a caterpillar made out of waffles. Initially the gameplay was inspired heavily by Pokémon Snap, but over time the gameplay evolved into "a weird amalgamation of all of these different game ideas." In addition to Pokémon Snap, the final game also takes inspiration from Ape Escape, Dark Cloud and Viva Piñata. Zuhn also stated that during the developmental phase, the storyline for Bugsnax was intended to be much darker.

The game was first revealed via an announcement trailer during Sony's Future Revealed PlayStation 5 event on June 11, 2020. The trailer featured the game's theme song "It's Bugsnax!", performed by British indie pop band Kero Kero Bonito. The song became popular in its own right, with GamesRadar calling it "the internet's new favorite meme ingredient", also writing "even if you haven't heard of Bugsnax, the game, there's a good chance you've probably heard Bugsnax, the theme tune."

Release
Bugsnax was released as a launch title for PlayStation 5 on November 12, 2020, alongside versions for PlayStation 4, macOS, and Windows via the Epic Games Store.

In January 2021, Young Horses confirmed they were working on a followup to Bugsnax, but had not determined whether this would be a proper sequel or downloadable content. The following October, this was revealed to be an expansion, Bugsnax: The Isle of Bigsnax, which would be added to the game via a free update in Q1 2022. The expansion was released on April 28, 2022, alongside ports of the game for Steam, Nintendo Switch, Xbox One, and Xbox Series X/S.

Reception and sales

Bugsnax on home consoles received "generally favorable reviews", while the Windows version saw "mixed or average reviews", according to the review aggregator Metacritic. Several critics noted how the story and presentation was perceived as light hearted but that the ending's effect gave the plot a dark tone. The game was also praised for its emphasis on character development and worldbuilding.

LGBT-video game blog Gayming Magazine praised the game's inclusion of same-sex couples. The game was nominated for a GLAAD Media Award for Outstanding Video Game.

Despite the game's PlayStation 5 version being available for free via PlayStation Plus for its first two months of release, Bugsnax has outsold Octodad: Dadliest Catch, Young Horses' previous game.

References

External links

Official reveal trailer

2020 video games
Adventure games
Indie video games
LGBT-related video games
PlayStation 5 games
PlayStation 4 games
Nintendo Switch games
Xbox One games
Xbox Series X and Series S games
Windows games
Video games about insects
Video games about food and drink
Video games developed in the United States
Video games set on fictional islands
MacOS games
Single-player video games
Video games with alternate endings